The following events occurred in August 1925:

August 1, 1925 (Saturday)
Domingos Leite Pereira became Prime Minister of Portugal for the third time.
The Eugene O'Neill play Desire Under the Elms was banned in Britain.
Many British seamen began a strike in response to their monthly wages bring cut on this day from £10 to £9. Many who were on land refused to sail out; others at sea stayed wherever they landed, from Australia to New Zealand to South Africa.
The film Parisian Love starring Clara Bow was released.

August 2, 1925 (Sunday)
The two-day Battle of al-Mazraa began in Syria.
The D. W. Griffith comedy film Sally of the Sawdust was released.
Born: Alan Whicker, British journalist and television host (Whicker's World), in Cairo, Egypt (d. 2013)

August 3, 1925 (Monday)
The Fascists won local elections in Sicily. Blackshirts were stationed intimidatingly at every voting booth.
The film The Goose Woman, starring Louise Dresser and Jack Pickford, was released.
Born: Dom Um Romão, jazz drummer, in Rio de Janeiro, Brazil (d. 2005)

August 4, 1925 (Tuesday)
Czechoslovakia and Upper Silesia were affected by flooding after heavy rainfall all summer. 
Born: Betty Trezza, baseball player, in Brooklyn, New York (d. 2007)

August 5, 1925 (Wednesday)
U.S. Marines were withdrawn from Nicaragua after a thirteen-year occupation since the country's 1912 civil war.
The Grand Olympic Auditorium opened in Los Angeles, California.
The so-called "Battle of Ammanford" was fought near the town of Ammanford in Wales as police defended a colliery from strikers determined to have a strikebreaking electrician removed.
Died: Georges Palante, 62, French philosopher and sociologist

August 6, 1925 (Thursday)
The Dallas Hilton, the first hotel to bear the Hilton name, opened.
Died: Loretta Perfectus Walsh, 29, first active-duty woman to serve in the United States Navy (tuberculosis)

August 7, 1925 (Friday)
The United Kingdom passed the Honours (Prevention of Abuses) Act, making it illegal to sell peerages or any other honours.
Born: M. S. Swaminathan, geneticist, in Kumbakonam, British India

August 8, 1925 (Saturday)
Approximately 40,000 members of the Ku Klux Klan marched down Pennsylvania Avenue in Washington, D.C.. A planned ceremony afterwards was cancelled due to heavy rain.
Born: Alija Izetbegovic, politician, in Bosanski Samac, Kingdom of Serbs, Croates and Slovenes (d. 2003)

August 9, 1925 (Sunday)
The Kakori conspiracy train robbery took place in India.
The German Socialist Labour Party of Poland was founded.
Born: David A. Huffman, computing pioneer, in Ohio (d. 1999)

August 10, 1925 (Monday)
Belgium and the United States opened talks in Washington, D.C. to settle Belgium's war debt.
Born: Bohuslav Chňoupek, politician, in Petržalka, Czechoslovakia (d. 2004)

August 11, 1925 (Tuesday)
French Foreign Minister Aristide Briand met with his British counterpart Austen Chamberlain in London to discuss Germany's proposed security pact.
Born Arlene Dahl, Broadway and film actress, in Minneapolis, Minnesota (d. 2021); Mike Douglas, singer, performer and television host, in Chicago (d. 2006)

August 12, 1925 (Wednesday)
Germany indicated that the return of at least some of its former colonies would be set as a condition to enter the League of Nations.
Born: Norris McWhirter, writer, activist and co-founder of Guinness World Records, in Winchmore Hill, London (d. 2004); and twin brother Ross McWhirter, journalist and also co-founder of Guinness World Records (d. 1975)

August 13, 1925 (Thursday)
A presidential decree in Turkey permitted women to wear hats and clothes of their choice for the first time, instead of being required to wear veils and somber colours. Turkish President Mustafa Kemal Atatürk used the same decree to divorce his wife, some six months after a scandalous affair arose from the suicide of one of Atatürk's mistresses.

August 14, 1925 (Friday)
The original Hetch Henny Moccasin Powerhouse went on line in Moccasin, Tuolumne County, California.
Tidal waves in Korea, 400 dead and 1000 missing extensive damage was done to houses and property.
Born: Rashid Karim, novelist, in Kolkata, West Bengal (d. 2011)

August 15, 1925 (Saturday)
Norway formally annexed the Spitzbergen Islands.
Born: Ruth Lessing, baseball player, in San Antonio, Texas (d. 2000); Oscar Peterson, jazz pianist and composer, in Montreal, Quebec (d. 2007); Bill Pinkney, singer, in Dalzell, South Carolina (d. 2007)
Died: Konrad Mägi, 46, Estonian landscape painter

August 16, 1925 (Sunday)
The film The Unholy Three, starring Lon Chaney, was released.
Born: Willie Jones, baseball player, in Dillon, South Carolina (d. 1983); Kirke Mechem, composer, in Wichita, Kansas

August 17, 1925 (Monday)
The Fourteenth World Zionist Congress opened in Vienna. 30 were hurt and 50 arrests were made as protests outside the congress by fascists turned violent.
A typhoon did extensive damage in Japan.
Died: Ioan Slavici, 77, Romanian writer

August 18, 1925 (Tuesday)
The United States and Belgium signed an agreement on Belgian war debt.
Born: Brian Aldiss, science fiction writer, in East Dereham, England (d. 2017)

August 19, 1925 (Wednesday)
The government of Guangdong banned British and Japanese ships from entering or leaving the region's ports.
A boiler exploded on the steamship Mackinac in Narragansett Bay off the coast of Rhode Island, killing 42.

August 20, 1925 (Thursday)
Middleweight boxing champion Harry Greb was seriously injured when his automobile skidded off a slippery road and overturned outside of Pittsburgh.

August 21, 1925 (Friday)
The British seamen's strike spread to Australia.
The Dutch football club FC Emmen was founded.

August 22, 1925 (Saturday)
Boxer Fidel LaBarba defeated Frankie Genaro in a ten-round decision to win the vacant World Flyweight Championship in Los Angeles.
Born: Honor Blackman, actress, in Plaistow, Newham, England (d. 2020); Terry Donahue, baseball player, in Saskatchewan, Canada (d. 2019)

August 23, 1925 (Sunday)
An assortment of fascists, monarchists and Nazis marched in a parade in Vienna protesting against the World Zionist Congress, shouting antisemitic slogans and singing patriotic songs.

August 24, 1925 (Monday)
The films The Street of Forgotten Men and Beggar on Horseback were released.
Welterweight boxing champion Mickey Walker fought William "Sailor" Friedman to a no-decision in Chicago. Al Capone met Walker in the dressing room before the match and advised him to go easy on Friedman.
Born: Duncan Hall, Australian rugby league player (d. 2011)

August 25, 1925 (Tuesday)
The Occupation of the Ruhr ended as the last French troops withdrew.
In the Rif War, The Moroccan Rif city of Al Hoceima was virtually leveled from Spanish naval bombardment.
Born: Thea Astley, novelist and short story writer, in Brisbane, Australia (d. 2004)
Died: Franz Graf Conrad von Hötzendorf, 72, Austrian field marshal

August 26, 1925 (Wednesday)
Thunderstorms and flooding killed 11 in Japan. Many bridges were washed out and a railway tunnel in Atami collapsed.
Marshal Philippe Pétain took command of French forces in the Rif War.
The film The Merry Widow opened.
Born: Jack Hirshleifer, American economist (d. 2005)

August 27, 1925 (Thursday)
The first issue of Automotive News was published. It was initially published five times a week.
Born: Nat Lofthouse, footballer, in Bolton, Lancashire, England (d. 2011)

August 28, 1925 (Friday)
Several prominent Nicaraguan politicians were kidnapped in Managua when armed men burst into a formal reception, took hostages and withdrew to the mountain-top fortress of La Loma.
Born: Donald O'Connor, dancer, singer and actor, in Chicago (d. 2003)

August 29, 1925 (Saturday)
The Nicaraguan rebels released their hostages and agreed to withdraw from La Loma in exchange for government pay-offs.
Babe Ruth was fined and suspended by New York Yankees manager Miller Huggins for failing to show up for batting practice.
In the Great Syrian Revolt, Druze rebels captured As-Suwayda citadel from the French after a forty-day siege.
The Mayfair Hotel opened in St. Louis, Missouri.
Born: Demetrio B. Lakas, President of Panama, in Colón, Panama (d. 1999)

August 30, 1925 (Sunday)
Chile held a constitutional referendum with a choice of two draft constitutions; the liberal version supported by President Arturo Alessandri won with 94.84% of the vote.
Mountaineer Norman Clyde attained first ascent of Mount Agassiz in California.
The Western film The Lucky Horseshoe was released.
Born: Laurent de Brunhoff, author and illustrator, in Paris (alive in 2021)

August 31, 1925 (Monday)
French and Spanish planes and warships conducted a massive bombardment of the Rif Republic capital of Ajdir.
It was announced that Germany had met all its due payments under the first year of the Dawes Plan, which had commenced on September 1, 1924.
A pair of PN-9 seaplanes under the direction of aviator John Rodgers took off from San Pablo, California, attempting to be the first to fly from California to Hawaii and set a new record for a non-stop flight by a seaplane. One of the planes was forced down early, but Rodgers' plane continued on into the night.
Born: Maurice Pialat, filmmaker, in Cunlhat, France (d. 2003); Pete Vonachen, American businessman (d. 2013)

References

1925
1925-08
1925-08